is a Japanese light novel series written by Ryota Hori and illustrated by bob. It began serialization online in 2009 on the user-generated novel publishing website Shōsetsuka ni Narō. It was acquired by Hobby Japan, who published the first light novel volume in October 2015 under their HJ Novels imprint. A manga adaptation with art by Yukari Yagi has been serialized online via Hobby Japan's Comic Fire website since 2016. Both the light novel and manga have been licensed in North America by J-Novel Club.

Media

Light novels 
Hobby Japan published the first light novel volume in print with illustrations by bob in September 2015. As of July 2022, twenty-two volumes have been published. The light novel is licensed in North America by J-Novel Club.

Volume list

Manga 
The light novel series was adapted into a manga series by Yukari Yagi and published by Hobby Japan. As of December 2021, the individual chapters have been collected into eight tankōbon volumes. The manga is also licensed by J-Novel Club.

Volume list

References

External Links 
  at Shōsetsuka ni Narō 
  
  
 

2015 Japanese novels
Anime and manga based on light novels
Isekai novels and light novels
J-Novel Club books
Japanese webcomics
Light novels
Light novels first published online
Hobby Japan manga
Isekai anime and manga
Shōnen manga
Shōsetsuka ni Narō
Webcomics in print